Elections to Derry City Council were held on 19 May 1993 on the same day as the other Northern Irish local government elections. The election used five district electoral areas to elect a total of 30 councillors.

Election results

Note: "Votes" are the first preference votes.

Districts summary

|- class="unsortable" align="centre"
!rowspan=2 align="left"|Ward
! % 
!Cllrs
! % 
!Cllrs
! %
!Cllrs
! %
!Cllrs
! % 
!Cllrs
!rowspan=2|TotalCllrs
|- class="unsortable" align="center"
!colspan=2 bgcolor="" | SDLP
!colspan=2 bgcolor="" | Sinn Féin
!colspan=2 bgcolor="" | DUP
!colspan=2 bgcolor="" | UUP
!colspan=2 bgcolor="white"| Others
|-
|align="left"|Cityside
|bgcolor="#99FF66"|50.0
|bgcolor="#99FF66"|3
|44.7
|2
|0.0
|0
|0.0
|0
|5.3
|0
|5
|-
|align="left"|Northland
|bgcolor="#99FF66"|56.6
|bgcolor="#99FF66"|5
|22.8
|2
|2.4
|0
|0.0
|0
|18.2
|0
|7
|-
|align="left"|Rural
|bgcolor="#99FF66"|50.7
|bgcolor="#99FF66"|3
|6.0
|1
|22.3
|1
|21.0
|2
|0.0
|0
|6
|-
|align="left"|Shantallow
|bgcolor="#99FF66"|65.0
|bgcolor="#99FF66"|4
|26.6
|1
|0.0
|0
|3.0
|0
|5.4
|0
|5
|-
|align="left"|Waterside
|18.8
|2
|8.6
|0
|bgcolor="#D46A4C"|37.0
|bgcolor="#D46A4C"|3
|17.9
|1
|17.7
|1
|7
|-
|- class="unsortable" class="sortbottom" style="background:#C9C9C9"
|align="left"| Total
|46.9
|17
|20.5
|5
|13.3
|5
|9.2
|2
|10.1
|1
|30
|-
|}

District results

Cityside

1989: 3 x SDLP, 3 x Sinn Féin
1993: 3 x SDLP, 2 x Sinn Féin
1989-1993 Change: Sinn Féin loss due to the reduction of one seat

Northland

1989: 4 x SDLP, 1 x Sinn Féin, 1 x Independent Unionist
1993: 5 x SDLP, 2 x Sinn Féin
1989-1993 Change: SDLP and Sinn Féin gain from Independent Unionist and due to the addition of one seat

Rural

1989: 3 x SDLP, 2 x DUP, 2 x UUP
1993: 3 x SDLP, 2 x DUP, 1 x UUP
1989-1993 Change: UUP loss due to the reduction of one seat

Shantallow

1989: 4 x SDLP, 1 x Sinn Féin
1993: 4 x SDLP, 1 x Sinn Féin
1989-1993 Change: No change

Waterside

1989: 2 x DUP, 1 x SDLP, 1 x UUP, 1 x UDP, 1 x Independent Unionist
1993: 3 x DUP, 2 x SDLP, 1 x UUP, 1 x Independent Unionist
1989-1993 Change: DUP and SDLP gain from UDP and due to the addition of one seat

References

Derry City Council elections
Derry